The Barcelona Provincial Council Local Museum Network, also known as Catalonia’s Biggest Museum, is a tool for support and collaboration from and for the museums of the province, which makes available to municipalities a series of services and actions aimed at improving, through the provision of direct services and research into viable formulas for supramunicipal cooperation, the management, conservation and dissemination of heritage and the museum facilities of the towns of Barcelona province. It is managed from the Cultural Heritage Office, which in turn depends on the Department of Knowledge and New Technologies of Barcelona Provincial Council.
It was started in 2001, the continuation of a collaboration effort established by the Local Museum Cooperation Committee, which was founded in 1988 in connection with the preparation for the 1st Conference on Museums and Local Administration. Its main objective is to work as a team toward a dynamic, versatile, pluridisciplinary museum model that is in touch with reality and with the lives of people, making local museums centres of public service that are close and accessible to the people, so that they may become benchmarks in the preservation of identity and collective memory as well as new centres of learning, socialisation, leisure and territorial development.

Museums in the network

In 2013, the network comprised 65 museums or facilities spread over 52 different municipalities:

 Arenys de Mar: Arenys de Mar Museum (Marès Lace Museum and Mollfulleda Mineralogy Museum)
 Argentona: Argentona Water Jug Museum
 Badalona: Badalona Museum
 Berga: Berga Interpretation Area
 Caldes d'Estrac: Palau Foundation
 Caldes de Montbui: Thermalia. Caldes de Montbui Museum
 Calella: Calella Josep M. Codina i Bagué Municipal Archive Museum
 Canet de Mar: Lluís Domènech i Montaner House-Museum
 Capellades: Capellades Paper Mill Museum
 Cardedeu: Cardadeu Tomàs Balvey Museum-Archive
 Castellbisbal: Museu de la Pagesia
 Cercs: Cercs Mine Museum
 Cerdanyola del Vallès: Cerdanyola Art Museum. Can Domènech, Cerdanyola Museum, Ca n'Oliver Iberian Settlement and Museum
 Cornellà de Llobregat: Mercader Palace Museum
 Esplugues de Llobregat: Can Tinturé Museum
 Folgueroles: Verdaguer House-Museum
 Gavà: Gavà Museum and the Gavà Mines Archaeological Park
 Granollers: Granollers Museum, Granollers Museum of Natural Sciences
 L'Hospitalet de Llobregat: Arranz-Bravo Foundation, L'Hospitalet Museum
 Igualada: Igualada Leather and L'Anoia Regional Museum, Muleteer's Museum. Antoni Ros Collection
 Manlleu: El Ter Industrial Museum - Can Sanglas
 Manresa: Museu Comarcal de Manresa
 Martorell: L'Enrajolada, Santacana House-Museum. Martorell, Vicenç Ros Municipal Museum
 El Masnou: El Masnou Municipal Nautical Museum
 Mataró: Mataró Museum
 Moià: Archaeological and Palaeontological Museum – El Toll Caves, Moià
 Molins de Rei: Molins de Rei Municipal Museum
 Mollet del Vallès: Abelló Museum
 Montcada i Reixac: Montcada Municipal Museum
 Montmeló: Montmeló Municipal Museum
 El Prat de Llobregat: El Prat Museum
 Premià de Dalt: Premià de Dalt Museum
 Premià de Mar: Premià de Mar Textile Printing Museum
 Ripollet: Molí d'en Rata Heritage Interpretation Centre
 Roda de Ter: L'Esquerda Archaeological Museum
 Rubí: Rubí Municipal Museum. El Castell-Urban Ecomuseum
 Sabadell: Sabadell Art Museum, Sabadell History Museum
 Sant Adrià del Besòs: History of Immigration in Catalonia Museum
 Sant Andreu de Llavaneres: Sant Andreu de Llavaneres Archive Museum
 Sant Boi de Llobregat: Sant Boi de Llobregat Museum
 Sant Cugat del Vallès: Sant Cugat Museum
 Sant Joan Despí: Jujol Centre - Can Negre
 Santa Coloma de Gramanet: Balldovina Tower Museum
 Sitges: Cau Ferrat Museum, Maricel Museum, Can Llopis Romanticism Museum
 Terrassa: Textile Museum and Documentation Centre and Terrassa Museum
 Tona: El Camp de les Lloses Interpretation Centre and Site
 Vic: Museum of Leather Artistry. A. Colomer Munmany Collection
 Viladecans: Ca n'Amat
 Vilafranca del Penedès: Casa de la Festa Major de Vilafranca del Penedès, Vinseum - Catalan Wine Cultures Museum
 Vilanova i la Geltrú: Can Papiol Romanticism Museum, Biblioteca Museu Víctor Balaguer
 Vilassar de Dalt: Vilassar de Dalt Archive-Museum
 Vilassar de Mar: Vilassar de Mar Municipal Museum

References

External links
 Local Museum Network site
 Local Museum Network at Barcelona Provincial Council site
 Barcelona Provincial Council site